This is an incomplete list of festivals in the United States with articles on Wikipedia, as well as lists of other festival lists, by geographic location. This list includes festivals of diverse types, among them regional festivals, commerce festivals, fairs, food festivals, arts festivals, religious festivals, folk festivals, and recurring festivals on holidays.

Festivals unique to the United States (and Canada and Mexico in some cases) include pow wows, Rocky Mountain Rendezvous, blues festivals, county fairs, state fairs, ribfests, and strawberry festivals. The first U.S. state fair was that of New York, held in 1841 in Syracuse, and has been held annually to the present year. The second state fair was in Detroit, Michigan, which started in 1849.

Lists of festivals by local

Territories
  List of festivals in American Samoa
  List of festivals in Guam
  List of festivals in Puerto Rico
  List of festivals in the United States Virgin Islands

Cities

 List of festivals in Atlanta
 List of festivals in Buffalo, New York
   List of festivals in Chicago (music) 
  List of events in Houston
  List of attractions and events in Indianapolis
  List of San Francisco Bay Area festivals and fairs
 List of Seattle street fairs and parades
 List of festivals and events in Tulsa, Oklahoma

States

Festivals by type

Alternative festivals 
 Burning Man — Black Rock City, Nevada
 Coney Island Mermaid Parade — New York City, New York
 Exotic Erotic Ball — San Francisco, California
 How Weird Street Faire — San Francisco, California
 King Mango Strut — Coral Gables, Florida
 New York's Village Halloween Parade —  New York City, New York
 Porcupine Freedom Festival — Lancaster, New Hampshire
 Rainbow Gathering — national and regional locations, worldwide
 Roswell UFO Festival — Roswell, New Mexico
 Sawdust Art Festival — Laguna Beach, California
 SLUG Queen — Eugene, Oregon

Arts and crafts festivals 
 Allentown Arts Festival — Buffalo, New York
 Amish Acres Arts & Crafts Festival — Nappanee, Indiana
 Ann Arbor Art Fairs — Ann Arbor, Michigan
 Bayou City Art Festival — Houston, Texas
 Catoctin Colorfest — Thurmont, Maryland
 Central Pennsylvania Festival of the Arts — State College, Pennsylvania
 Cherry Creek Arts Festival — Cherry Creek, Colorado
 Detroit Festival of the Arts — Detroit, Michigan
 Dogwood Arts Festival — Knoxville, Tennessee
 Festival of the Arts — Grand Rapids, Michigan
 Half Moon Bay Art and Pumpkin Festival — Half Moon Bay, California
 Lake Eden Arts Festival — Black Mountain, North Carolina
 Mayfair — Allentown, Pennsylvania 
 St. James Art Fair — Louisville, Kentucky
 Sawdust Art Festival — Laguna Beach, California
 Summer Camp Music Festival — Chillicothe, Illinois
 Vermont Quilt Festival — Essex, Vermont

Beer festivals 
 Great American Beer Festival (established 1982) — Denver, Colorado
 Houston Beer Fest (established 2011) — Houston, Texas
 Oregon Brewers Festival (established 1988) — Portland, Oregon

Celebration/talk festivity 
 Cheeseburger in Caseville — Caseville, Michigan
 ComFest — Columbus, Ohio
 Friendship Festival — Buffalo, New York and Fort Erie, Ontario, Canada
 Gasparilla Pirate Festival — Tampa, Florida
 Hessler Street Fair — Cleveland, Ohio
 Minneapolis Aquatennial — Minneapolis, Minnesota
 Pecan Street Festival — Austin, Texas
 Red River Revel — Shreveport, Louisiana
 Saint Paul Winter Carnival — Saint Paul, Minnesota

Contemporary Christian Festivals 
 Cornerstone Festival — Bushnell, Illinois
 Creation Festival — the Gorge Amphitheater in George, Washington and Agape Farm in Mount Union, Pennsylvania 
 LifeLight Festival — Sioux Falls, South Dakota
 Sonshine Festival — Willmar, Minnesota

Culture, heritage and folk festivals 
 Aloha Festivals — Hawaii
 Arlington International Film Festival — Arlington, Massachusetts
 Borderfest — Rio Grande Valley, Texas
 Cleveland Feast of the Assumption Festival — Cleveland, Ohio
 Dublin Irish Festival — Dublin, Ohio
 Feast of San Gennaro — New York City, New York
 Festival Latinoamericano — Provo, Utah
 FinnFestUSA
 Folkmoot — Waynesville, North Carolina
 Greek Food Festival of Dallas — Dallas, Texas
 Hungarian Festival — New Brunswick, New Jersey
 Indy Irish Festival — Indianapolis, Indiana
 International Children's Festival — Washington, DC
 Italian Heritage Festival — Wheeling, West Virginia
 Johnny Appleseed Festival — Fort Wayne, Indiana
 Kansas City Irish Fest — Kansas City, Missouri
 Little Italy Festival — Clinton, Indiana
 Lowell Folk Festival — Lowell, Massachusetts
 New Jersey Folk Festival — New Brunswick, New Jersey
 New Orleans Jazz & Heritage Festival — New Orleans, Louisiana
 Nisei Week — Little Tokyo, Los Angeles, California
 North Texas Irish Festival — Dallas, Texas
 Northwest Folklife Festival — Seattle, Washington
 Pepper Jelly Festival — Thomaston, Alabama
 Pittsburgh Folk Festival — Pittsburgh, Pennsylvania
 Portugal Day Festival — Newark, New Jersey
 Riverfront Irish Festival — Cuyahoga Falls, Ohio
 Taste of Polonia — Chicago, Illinois
 Texas Folklife Festival — San Antonio, Texas
 Tulip Time Festival — Holland, Michigan
 World of Nations Celebration — Jacksonville, Florida
 World's Largest Disco — Buffalo, New York
 Ypsilanti Heritage Festival — Ypsilanti, Michigan

Film festivals
 List of film festivals in the United States

Fine art and theatre festivals 
 Alabama Shakespeare Festival — Montgomery, Alabama
 Allentown Art Festival — Buffalo, New York
 Arizona Renaissance Festival — Apache Junction, Arizona
 Artscape — Baltimore, Maryland
 Bristol Renaissance Faire — Kenosha, Wisconsin
 Carolina Renaissance Festival — Huntersville, North Carolina
 Central Pennsylvania Festival of the Arts — State College, Pennsylvania
 Curtain Up! — Buffalo, New York
 Grand Cities Art Fest — Grand Forks, North Dakota/East Grand Forks, Minnesota
 Kansas City Renaissance Festival — Bonner Springs, Kansas
 Maryland Renaissance Festival — Crownsville, Maryland
 MasterWorks Festival — Cedarville, Ohio
 Minnesota Renaissance Festival — Shakopee, Minnesota
 New York Renaissance Faire — Tuxedo, New York
 North Carolina School of the Arts Summer Performance Festival — Manteo, North Carolina
 Oregon Shakespeare Festival — Ashland, Oregon
 The River To River Festival — New York, New York
 Savannah Music Festival — Savannah, Georgia
 Sterling Renaissance Festival — Sterling, New York
 True/False Film Festival — Columbia, Missouri
 Utah Shakespearean Festival — Cedar City, Utah

Flower festivals 
 International Cherry Blossom Festival — Macon, Georgia
 Lilac Festival — Rochester, New York
 Lompoc Valley Flower Festival — Lompoc, California
 National Cherry Blossom Festival — Washington, DC
 Philadelphia Flower Show — Philadelphia, Pennsylvania
 Portland Rose Festival — Portland, Oregon
 Seattle Hempfest — Seattle, Washington
 Shenandoah Apple Blossom Festival — Winchester, Virginia
 Texas Rose Festival — Tyler, Texas
 Tulip Festival — Holland, Michigan
 Washington State Apple Blossom Festival — Wenatchee, Washington

Food, harvest and wild game festivals 

 Apple Festival —  Bayfield, Wisconsin
 Banana Split Festival —  Wilmington, Ohio
 Barnesville Pumpkin Festival —  Barnesville, Ohio
 Brushy Mountain Apple Festival —  North Wilkesboro, North Carolina
 Circleville Pumpkin Show —  Circleville, Ohio
 Delmarva Chicken Festival —  Delmarva Peninsula
 Festival of the Fish —  Vermilion, Ohio
 Florida food festivals —  Florida
 Gilroy Garlic Festival —  Gilroy, California
 Half Moon Bay Art and Pumpkin Festival —  Half Moon Bay, California
 Jackson County Apple Festival —  Jackson, Ohio
 Kentucky Apple Festival —  Paintsville, Kentucky
 Lexington Barbecue Festival —  Lexington, North Carolina
 Louisiana Fur and Wildlife Festival —  Cameron, Louisiana
 Morton Pumpkin Festival —  Morton, Illinois
 National Buffalo Wing Festival —  Buffalo, New York
 National Cherry Festival —  Traverse City, Michigan
 National Cornbread Festival National Cornbread Festival —  South Pittsburg, Tennessee
 North Carolina Wine Festival —  Clemmons, North Carolina
 Norwalk Oyster Festival —  Norwalk, Connecticut
 Parker County Peach Festival —   Weatherford, Texas
 Paso Robles Wine Festival —  Paso Robles, California
 Roanoke-Chowan Pork-Fest —  Murfreesboro, North Carolina
 Schmeckfest —  Freeman, South Dakota
 Strawberry Festival —  Poteet, Texas
 Sweet Corn Festival —  Fairborn, Ohio
 Taste of Buffalo —  Buffalo, New York
 Taste of Chicago —  Chicago, Illinois
 A Taste of Colorado
 West Side Nut Club Fall Festival — Evansville, Indiana
 Yadkin Valley Wine Festival  —  Elkin, North Carolina
 Yambilee Festival —  Opelousas, Louisiana

Holiday festivals 
 Christmas on the River — Demopolis, Alabama
 New Orleans Mardi Gras — New Orleans, Louisiana
 Spirit of America Festival — Decatur, Alabama
 West Side Nut Club Fall Festival — Evansville, Indiana

Innovation festivals 
 One Spark crowdfunding festival — Jacksonville, Florida

LGBT festivals 
 Capital Pride —  Washington, DC
 Fantasia Fair —  Provincetown, Massachusetts
 Frameline —  San Francisco, California
 Newfest —  New York, New York
 Outfest —  Los Angeles, California
 PeaceOUT World Homo Hop Festival —  Oakland, California
 Southern Decadence —  New Orleans, Louisiana
 Utah Pride Festival —  Salt Lake City, Utah
 White Party —  Palm Springs, California

Music festivals

Pagan festivals 

 Faerieworlds — Eugene, Oregon
 Pagan Spirit Gathering  — near Salem, Missouri
 Starwood Festival — Wisteria Campground in Pomeroy, Ohio

Pioneer festivals 
 Days of '47 Parade — Salt Lake City, Utah
 Pioneer Days — Kalida, Ohio
 Pioneer Days  — Utah state holiday with multiple celebrations throughout the state

Religious festivals 
 Vaisakhi — Yuba City, California
 Wild Goose Festival — Hot Springs, North Carolina
 X-Day (Church of the SubGenius) — Wisteria Campground in Pomeroy, Ohio

Renaissance fairs

Rodeo and horse racing festivals 
 Days of '47 Rodeo — Salt Lake City, Utah
 Houston Livestock Show and Rodeo — Houston, Texas
 Kentucky Derby Festival — Louisville, Kentucky

Science festivals
 Trenton Computer Festival
 World Science Festival — New York, New York

Seasonal festivals 
 Apple Blossom Festival — Winchester, Virginia
 Evansville Freedom Festival — Evansville, Indiana
 Memphis in May — Memphis, Tennessee
 Sawdust Art Festival — Laguna Beach, California 
 Three Rivers Festival — Fort Wayne, Indiana
 West Side Nut Club Fall Festival — Evansville, Indiana
 Woollybear Festival — Vermilion, Ohio

Sports festivals 
 Arnold Sports Festival — Columbus, Ohio
 Bridge Day — Fayetteville, West Virginia

Storytelling festivals 
 National Storytelling Festival — Jonesborough, Tennessee
 Southern Ohio Storytelling Festival — Chillicothe, Ohio
 Timpanogos Storytelling Festival — Orem, Utah

Transportation festivals 
 Segway Fest — varying locations
 Tall Stacks — Cincinnati, Ohio

See also

 Culture of the United States
 Tourism in the United States
 Tourist attractions in the United States
 Public holidays in the United States

References

External links

 List
 
United States